Gianni Vincent Paolo (born ), is an American actor, writer and director prestigious for playing the role of Brayden Weston on Power and its spin-off and sequel, Power Book II: Ghost. He is also notable for portraying Chaz in the 2019 horror film Ma.

Early life 
Paolo was born on May 27, 1996 in Providence, Rhode Island. In 2013, he was drafted 202nd overall in the Quebec Major Junior Hockey League draft by the Shawinigan Cataractes. His rights were later acquired by the Charlottetown Islanders in exchange for a second round pick.

Paolo later moved to Los Angeles to pursue acting at the age of 19.

Career 

In collaboration with Michael Rainey Jr., Paolo has launched an entertainment company, Twenty Two Entertainment, which is fully funded by Artists For Artists and set to produce films, TV series, and multimedia ventures.

Gianni is also known for his work on the This Past Weekend Podcast hosted by comedian Theo Von.

Filmography

References

External links 

 

1996 births
Living people
21st-century American male actors
American male television actors